KANA (580 AM) is a radio station licensed to serve Anaconda, Montana. The station is owned by Ted Austin, through licensee Southwest Montana Media LLC. It airs a classic hits music format.

The station's transmitter site is off Landfill Road in Anaconda, Montana.

The station was assigned the KANA call letters by the Federal Communications Commission.

Ownership
In December 2006, a deal was reached for KANA to be acquired by Butte Broadcasting, Inc. (Ronald Davis, president/general manager) from Jim Ray Carroll as part of a 3 station deal with a total reported sale price of $500,000.

Butte Broadcasting donated KANA to A.W.A.R.E., Inc., a non-profit corporation, effective August 3, 2012.

Effective October 25, 2018, A.W.A.R.E., Inc. sold KANA to Ted Austin's Southwest Montana Media LLC for $25,000.

July 25th the Broadcasting tower was dismantled, it is currently NON-Existent, after a year of being un-lit.

References

External links

 
 

ANA
Classic hits radio stations in the United States
Radio stations established in 1980
1980 establishments in Montana